HSC Superexpress is a  wave piercing catamaran built by Incat, owned by Golden Star Ferries and chartered to Viking Line. During her delivery voyage on 9 June 1998, as Catalonia, she set the record for the fastest Atlantic Eastbound Record, previously held by another Incat craft Hoverspeed Great Britain.

During that same voyage, the ship became the first passenger ship to cover  or more in one 24-hour period. Six weeks later, sister craft HSC Fjord Cat took the record.

As of January 2016 P&O Ferries announced that they would end the Larne-Troon service provided by HSC Express, this has ended 25 years of fastcraft service between Northern Ireland and Scotland.

Mediterranean service
Following her record-breaking Atlantic Ocean crossing, the vessel changed name to Catalonia L and entered service with Buquebus between Barcelona and Palma, Majorca and later between Ceuta, Málaga and Algeciras.

English Channel service
In 2000 she was chartered to P&O Portsmouth for service between Portsmouth and Cherbourg replacing the smaller Superstar Express and adopted the trading name Portsmouth Express though her official name remained Catalonia. Her first season as Portsmouth Express was marred by a series of serious technical problems which at one point resulted in the Superstar Express returning to the route from P&O Irish Sea. The ship operated with P&O Portsmouth during the 2000, 2001 and 2002 summer seasons and returned to Buquebus for the rest of the year, in each summer season on the Cherbourg route the ship experienced a number of technical problems which often resulted in the ship running on three or less of its four engines. In 2002 the ship's marketing name became Express after P&O Portsmouth became part of P&O Ferries. In 2004 the ship was officially renamed Express but her marketing name became Cherbourg Express to differentiate the service from Caen Express which P&O started that year. In September 2004 the ship completed her final Portsmouth-Cherbourg sailing and the ship was laid up at A&P Birkenhead.

Irish Sea service
In 2005 her charter was transferred to P&O Irish Sea and the ship once again replaced Superstar Express. Prior to her entering service with P&O Irish Sea the Club Lounge was removed and standard seating installed with the Club Bar rebranded to P&O's Harbour Coffee Company. The large shop was divided into a smaller retail outlet, gaming area, quiet lounge and 'Poets' bar.  Express sailed with P&O Irish Sea on the routes between Troon/Cairnryan, Scotland and Larne, Northern Ireland. In 2010 she began operating sailings from Larne to Douglas on behalf of the Isle of Man Steam Packet Company during the Isle of Man TT season. Leaving Larne at 23:59 - arrive Douglas 2:44, Leave Douglas - 03:00 - Arrive Larne - 05:45. By doing this they have fitted it in around the normal timetable on the Larne - Cairnryan and Larne - Troon Routes.

In 2013 Express received a £500,000 interior refurbishment which included reinstatement of the Club Lounge which was removed when the ship moved to the Irish Sea.  From 2013 Express  no longer makes a roundtrip between Larne and Cairnryan instead operating two roundtrips between Larne Harbour and Troon. The Express charter was not renewed after the summer season ending September 2015 and is believed to be heading to run on a Scandinavian route next year. She is currently laid up in Helsingborg (Feb 2016) her P&O livery has already been painted over. P&O announced on 13 January 2016 that the Troon-Larne service was to close with immediate effect.

Sister ships
Express is one of four 91-metre wave piercing catamarans built by Incat but differs from the other three because of her addition lounge and large scenic window over the stern. The bridge of the Express and other Incat 91 metre craft is very similar to the Incat 81 metre craft Hull 038-Rapide, Hull 040-Stena Lynx 3, Hull 041-Diamant

 Sister ships

References

External links
 Incat hull 047
 P&O Irish Sea Ferries official website
  Express current position at VesselTracker

|-

1998 ships
Blue Riband holders
Ferries of Northern Ireland
Ferries of Scotland
Ferries of the United Kingdom
Incat high-speed craft
Ships built by Incat